This is a list of lesbian filmmakers. The names listed include directors, producers, and screenwriters of feature films, television movies, documentaries and short films; and have received coverage or been recognized in reliable, authoritative media and academic sources.

A-L

 Kasia Adamik (Poland)
 Jane Anderson (USA)
 Sini Anderson (USA)
 Chantal Akerman (Belgium)
 Dorothy Arzner (USA)
 Jamie Babbit (USA)
 Marina Rice Bader (USA)
 Christin Baker (USA)
 Janet Baus (USA)
 Sadie Benning (USA)
 Caroline Berler (USA)
 Katja Blichfeld (USA)
 Maureen Bradley (Canada)
 Netalie Braun (Israel)
 Katherine Brooks (USA)
 Dominique Cardona (Canada)
 Ilene Chaiken (USA)
 Lisa Cholodenko (USA)
 Zero Chou (Taiwan)
 Laurie Colbert (Canada)
 Janis Cole (Canada)
 Nicole Conn (USA)
 Catherine Corsini (France)
 Jeanne Crépeau (Canada)
 Catherine Crouch (USA)
 Holly Dale (Canada)
 Donna Deitch (USA)
 Katrina del Mar (USA)
 Vicky Du (USA-Taiwan)
 Cheryl Dunye (Liberia)
 Clea DuVall (USA)
 Michelle Ehlen (USA)
 Esther Eng (USA)
 Lynne Fernie (Canada)
 Jodie Foster (USA)
 Su Friedrich (USA)
 Maya Gallus (Canada)
 Nisha Ganatra (Canada)
 Dana Goldberg (Israel)
 Rosser Goodman (USA)
 Marleen Gorris (Netherlands)
 Aurora Guerrero (USA)
 Sonali Gulati (USA)
 Jill Gutowitz (USA)
 Barbara Hammer (USA)
 Leslye Headland (USA)
 G. B. Jones (Canada)
 Ingrid Jungermann (USA)
 Ana Kokkinos (Australia)
 Jennie Livingston (USA)
 Desiree Lim (Malaysia-China-Canada)
 Phyllida Lloyd (UK)
 Tucia Lyman (USA)

M-Z

 Angelina Maccarone (Germany)
 Lucrecia Martel (Argentina)
 Dee Mosbacher (USA)
 Brittani Nichols (USA)
 Madeleine Olnek (USA)
 Jenni Olson (USA)
 Ulrike Ottinger (Germany)
 Jan Oxenberg (USA)
 Pratibha Parmar (UK) 
 Stacie Passon (USA)
 Kimberly Peirce (USA)
 Cristina Perincioli (Switzerland)
 Justine Pimlott (Canada)
 Léa Pool (Canada)
 Lourdes Portillo (USA-Mexico)
 Yvonne Rainer (USA)
 Dee Rees (USA)
 Yoruba Richen (USA)
 Marialy Rivas (Chile)
 Chloé Robichaud (Canada)
 Angela Robinson (USA)
 Patricia Rozema (Canada)
 Marja-Lewis Ryan (USA)
 Shamim Sarif (UK)
 Greta Schiller (USA)
 Céline Sciamma (France)
 Avigail Sperber (Israel)
Ellen Spiro (USA)
 Monika Treut (Germany)
 Rose Troche (USA)
 Guinevere Turner (USA)
 Michal Vinik (Israel)
 Louise Wadley (Australia)
 Andrea Weiss (USA)
 Aerlyn Weissman (USA-Canada)
 Yvonne Welbon (USA)
 Tucky Williams (USA)
 Alice Wu (USA)
 Monica Zanetti (Australia)

See also 

 List of female film and television directors
 List of LGBT-related films directed by women
 List of gay, lesbian or bisexual people
 New Queer Cinema
 Sexuality and gender identity-based cultures

References

Further reading

External links 
  Cinema Systers Film Festival (United States)
  Lethal Lesbian Film Festival (Israel)
  London Lesbian Film Festival (Canada)
  	Lavender Limelight: Lesbians in Film 1998 documentary at Kanopy
  Dykes, Camera, Action! 2018 documentary by Caroline Berler

Film-related lists
Filmmakers
Lesbians by occupation
 Lesbian
 Lesbian
Lesbian filmmakers
Lesbian
Lists of LGBT-related people
Film directors